The California International Law Center is a research center at the University of California, Davis School of Law (Martin Luther King, Jr. Hall) that focuses on international, comparative, and transnational law. It works to promote scholarship, curricular and career development, and partnerships with organizations such as the American Society of International Law and the Robert F. Kennedy Center for Justice and Human Rights.  It was founded in 2009.  CILC's director is Diane Marie Amann, a distinguished scholar in the area of international law.  The acronym "CILC" is pronounced as "silk."  CILC sponsors the Asylum and Refugee Law National Moot Court Competition.

Darfur Project
CILC has partnered with the Robert F. Kennedy Center for Justice and Human Rights for special project focused on the crisis in Darfur.  RFK's 2007 Human Rights Laureate Dr. Mohammed Ahmed Abdallah, academic faculty from throughout California, and CILC's fellow, students, and alumni will participate in creating a report of past reconciliation efforts.

Global Council 
CILC's Global Council consists of leaders in international legal and policy advocacy.  Current members of the council include Prof. Clayborne Carson, Prof. Mireille Delmas-Marty, Prof. William A. Schabas, former ambassador Derek Shearer, and Judge Patricia M. Wald.

References

External links
 Law.ucdavis.edu homepage

International law
University of California, Davis